Gustavo Méndes Nunes (born October 11, 1981 in Brazil) is a Brazilian footballer.

Club career
He has played for A.D. Isidro Metapán in El Salvador.

References

1981 births
Living people
Brazilian footballers
Alianza F.C. footballers
A.D. Isidro Metapán footballers
Expatriate footballers in El Salvador
Association football forwards